Sparkwell is a small  village and civil parish in the  South Hams district of Devon.  Historically it was part of Haytor Hundred.

Its local Anglican church is All Saints Church, Sparkwell.
Its local non-conformist church is Lee Mill Congregational Church, which is affiliated to the EFCC.

It is home to an erstwhile one-Michelin-star pub and restaurant, the Treby Arms, previously run by MasterChef: The Professionals winner Anton Piotrowski.

Dartmoor Zoological Park is located on the outskirts of the village. The true story of Benjamin Mee's acquisition of the zoo inspired his book We Bought a Zoo, which was later adapted into a film starring Matt Damon.

The Hemerdon Mine is located in the parish.

References 

Villages in South Hams
Civil parishes in South Hams